La Ronde is a commune in the Charente-Maritime department in southwestern France.

Population

See also
Communes of the Charente-Maritime department

References

External links

 Ronde La Ronde on the Quid site

Ronde
Charente-Maritime communes articles needing translation from French Wikipedia